Pir was a legendary king of the Britons according to Geoffrey of Monmouth's History of the Kings of Britain. He was preceded by Samuil Penissel, and succeeded by Capoir.

References

Legendary British kings